Edgar Xavier Marvelo (born December 16, 1998) is a wushu taolu athlete from Indonesia. He is a three-time world champion as well as a medalist at the Asian Games and the Southeast Asian Games.

Career

Junior 
Marvelo began practicing wushu at the age of six. During his youth, he won a gold medal in gunshu at the 2010 World Junior Wushu Championships respectively. He won a gold medal at the 2014 ASEAN School Games and a year later in 2015, Marvelo was the Indonesian youth national champion.

Senior 
Marvelo's first major international appearance was at the 2017 Southeast Asian Games where he won a bronze medal in the men’s changquan event. He then debuted at the 2017 World Wushu Championships where he won a silver medal in men’s daoshu. A year later, Marvelo won Indonesia’s first medal at the 2018 Asian Games by placing second in the men's changquan event.

In 2019, he competed again at the World Wushu Championships and earned three gold medals in men’s changquan, gunshu, and in the duilian event with Harris Horatius and Seraf Naro Siregar. His achievement of three gold medals made him the most prolific non-Chinese athlete during a single rendition of the championships. A few weeks after the competition, Marvelo won two more gold medals at the 2019 Southeast Asian Games in the men’s daoshu and gunshu combined event and duilian. He dedicated his victory at the games to his late father, who died during the morning of his event.

Edgar's first major competition after the start of the COVID-19 pandemic was at the 2021 Pekan Olahraga Nasional (National Sports Week) in Java where he won gold medals in changquan as well as in daoshu and gunshu combined. Following this, he competed in the 2021 Southeast Asian Games (which was rescheduled to 2022) where he did not place in any event. Two months later, he won the gold medal in men's changquan at the 2022 World Games.

Edgar has appeared on the Hitam Putih and Brownis Indonesian television programs.

Competitive History

Awards 
 Indonesian Journalists Association: Best male athlete (2022)
 : Outstanding sports player (2020)
 Fila: Indonesian brand ambassador (2022)

See also 

 List of Asian Games medalists in wushu

References

External links 
 Edgar's profile on Instagram
 Athlete profile at the 2018 Asian Games

1998 births
Living people
Sportspeople from Jakarta
Indonesian wushu practitioners
Wushu practitioners at the 2018 Asian Games
Asian Games silver medalists for Indonesia
Asian Games medalists in wushu
Medalists at the 2018 Asian Games
Competitors at the 2017 Southeast Asian Games
Competitors at the 2019 Southeast Asian Games
Southeast Asian Games gold medalists for Indonesia
Southeast Asian Games bronze medalists for Indonesia
Southeast Asian Games medalists for Indonesia
Competitors at the 2021 Southeast Asian Games
Competitors at the 2022 World Games
World Games gold medalists
World Games medalists in wushu
21st-century Indonesian people